The Great Daruma was a monumental portrait created by Japanese artist Hokusai on 5 October 1817. Also known as the Great Bodhidarma, the work is a depiction of Bodhidharma, known in Japan as Daruma, a revered Buddhist monk of the 5th or 6th century. The original artwork was destroyed by the bombing of Nagoya in May 1945.

Background 
The Great Daruma was not Hokusai's first monumental portrait.

Conception 

Hokusai made the Great Daruma in a courtyard beside the Hongan-ji Nagoya Betsuin Buddhist temple in Nagoya, Japan. The portrait depicted the head of the monk and his upper body swathed in flowing robes.

The event was advertised in advance to draw a large crowd. Hokusai and his pupils wore special attire. They spent the morning preparing the vats of ink and laying the extra thick paper on a bed of straw. Hokusai worked for hours adding bold lines of ink until the image was finally revealed when the paper was hoisted into the air using a large wooden beam attached to one end, like a gigantic hanging scroll, or the huge thongdrel thankas of Tibetan Buddhism (usually in silk appliqué).

Reception 
As a result of this dramatic feat, Hokusai became known in Nagoya as "Daruma-sen", the Daruma master. The triumph brought greater attention to Hokusai, enabling him to sell more prints to the public, including prints of the Great Daruma. He published a new volume of his Manga sketches in 1817. The event was recounted in a popular song and celebrated in a printed surimono and large reproduction (pictured). The feat was described in Kōriki Enkōan's Detailed Illustrations of Hokusai’s Large Scale Sketches the same year. A later illustrated account features in Iijima Hanjūrō's 1893 Biography of Katsushika Hokusai.

In 2017, the bicentennial anniversary of the event, the painting was recreated with the cooperation of Aichi University of the Arts and Nagoya City Museum.

Destruction 
The original artwork survived in Nagoya until May 1945, when it was destroyed along with the wooden temple building in the bombing of Nagoya in World War II. Contemporaneous promotional handbills survive, with some held at the Nagoya City Museum.

Gallery

References

 特別展　北斎だるせん (Special exhibition Hokusai), Nagoya City Museum
 Hanging scroll of Daruma smiling, traditionally attributed to Hokusai, British Museum
 

1817 paintings
Works by Hokusai
Culture in Nagoya
History of Nagoya
Buddhist paintings
Lost works of art